Infante Enrique, 1st Duke of Seville (17 April 182312 March 1870), was an Infante of Spain and a member of the Spanish branch of the House of Bourbon. He was the grandson of Charles IV of Spain and became the first Duke of Seville in 1823. He was known for his progressive, even revolutionary, ideas during the reign of his double first cousin and sister-in-law, Isabella II of Spain.

Early life
Infante Enrique was born at Seville, Spain, the fourth child and second son of Infante Francisco de Paula of Spain (1794–1865; son of Charles IV of Spain and Princess Maria Luisa of Parma) and his wife, Princess Luisa Carlotta of the Two Sicilies (1804–1844), who was the daughter of Francis I of the Two Sicilies and Infanta Maria Isabella of Spain.

Born in the Andalusian city of Seville, his uncle King Ferdinand VII granted him the title of Duke of Seville in 1823. Ferdinand VII had conferred the title of Duke of Cádiz on Infante Francisco de Paula's first son Francisco de Asís in 1820 and then, after the child's death the following year, on Infante Francisco de Paula's next son, Francis. Enrique was baptized with the name Enrique María Fernando Carlos Francisco Luís and his godparents were his maternal aunt, Princess Marie Caroline, Duchess of Berry, and her son, the Duke of Bordeaux, for whom he was named.

In 1833, the death of his uncle, King Ferdinand VII, divided the court between supporters of Queen Isabella II, and their mutual uncle, Don Carlos. Enrique's aunt, Queen mother Maria Christina of the Two Sicilies, the widow of Ferdinand VII, served as regent of Spain on Isabella's behalf from 1833 to 1840.

The second marriage of Maria Christina with Agustín Fernando Muñoz y Sánchez in 1833 caused a disagreement between her and her sister, Infanta Luisa Carlotta, resulting in the banishment of Luisa Carlota and her family to Paris, where the queen consort of France, Maria Amalia of Naples and Sicily, was her aunt.

Enrique and his brothers were educated in the French capital. At the Lycée he met his cousin, Antoine, Duke of Montpensier, with whom he later developed an intense rivalry that would eventually end in tragedy. Enrique spent time in Belgium, where his cousin, Louise, was queen. There he learned of the expulsion from Spain in 1840 of Maria Christina and her husband.

Finally able to return to Spain, Enrique soon began his military career in Ferrol, Galicia, where he was praised for his excellent conduct. In 1843 he was promoted to lieutenant, and was commander of the ship Manzanares. By 1845 he was captain of a frigate.

Although a possible marriage between Enrique and Isabella II was considered, she married Enrique's brother, Francis, Duke of Cádiz, who was Enrique's elder, but whose effeminacy had been construed as rendering him an unlikely father and therefore a less suitable marital candidate. At the same time the queen's younger sister, Infanta Luisa, was married to the Duke of Montpensier at the instigation of France.

Openly offended at these setbacks, and accused of taking part in a revolt against the monarchy in Galicia, Enrique was expelled from Spain in March 1846, shortly before the wedding of his brother and the Queen. Don Enrique took refuge in Belgium, where his sister Isabel Fernandina was staying. At that time he was considered a candidate for the Throne of Mexico, although there is little evidence that Enrique pursued that prospect.

Marriage and family

Shortly thereafter, Enrique was allowed to return to Spain, where he met  (1821–1863), daughter of Antonio de Padua de Castellvi y Fernández de Córdoba, Count of Castellá, and his wife Margarita Shelly. The Queen did not support the misalliance, so the couple eloped to Rome on 6 May 1847. Upon the couple's return to Spain, they were banished to Bayonne, later settling in Toulouse.

They had four sons and one daughter:
Enrique de Borbón y Castellví, 2nd Duke of Seville (3 October 1848 – 12 July 1894), who married Joséphine Parade in 1870, and had issue.
Luis de Borbón y Castellví (7 November 1851 – 25 February 1854).
Francisco de Paula de Borbón y Castellví (29 March 1853 – 28 March 1942), who married Maria Luisa de La Torre y Bassave in 1877, and had issue. He married secondly Felisa de León y Navarro de Balboa in 1890, and had further issue.
Alberto de Borbón y Castellví, 1st Duke of Santa Elena (22 February 1854 – 21 January 1939), who married Marguerite d'Ast de Novelé in 1878, and had issue.
María del Olvido de Borbón y Castellví (28 November 1863 – 14 April 1907), who married Cárlos Fernández-Maquieira y Oyanguren in 1888, and had issue.

Return to Spain
While in France, Enrique several times proclaimed himself a revolutionary, and was asked to join the International Workingmen's Association. He publicly became a freemason, and attained the 33rd rank in the Masonic Scottish Rite.

On 13 May 1848 he was stripped of his royal rank and titles (his children, being born of a morganatic marriage were untitled). In 1849 he asked the Queen's forgiveness in order to return from exile. The family settled in Valladolid in 1851, but were soon forced to return to France. Later in 1854 he returned to Spain, residing in Valencia, where his fourth son, Alberto, was born and where his second son, Luis, died shortly after Alberto's birth. Enrique's ducal title was restored, but not the title of Infante.

Exile to France
Soon after the Duke of Seville again expressed leftist ideas in 1860, he again went in exile to France. There he obtained the rank of Captain General of the army, and three years later he was promoted to Lieutenant General. In 1863 his wife died after giving birth to their fifth child, and was buried in the Convent of Las Descalzas Reales, rather than in the Spanish royal tombs at the El Escorial, reserved for queens and infantas of Spain.

Death

Between 1869 and 1870, Enrique published several pamphlets and articles hostile to his cousin, Antoine, Duke of Montpensier. He challenged Montpensier to a duel, which took place near La Fortuna in Leganés, Madrid, on 12 March 1870. Enrique was shot and killed, removing him as a public critic of the duke's alleged aspirations on the Spanish throne.

Enrique's eldest son refused to accept the 30,000 pesetas that the Duke of Montpensier offered as compensation. Enrique, who was no longer an Infante of Spain, could not be buried in El Escorial, but was buried in the Saint Isidore Cemetery, in Madrid.

Enrique's children were adopted by his brother, Francis.

Arms

Ancestry

Notes and sources

thePeerage.com - Enrique Maria Fernando de Borbón, Duque de Sevilla
Mateos Sáinz de Medrano, Ricardo. The Unknown Infant of Spain. Thassalia, 1996.
Mateos Sáinz de Medrano, Ricardo. Nobleza Obliga. La Esfera de Los Libros, 2006. .

1823 births
1870 deaths
Duelling fatalities
101
House of Bourbon (Spain)
Knights of the Golden Fleece of Spain
Spanish infantes
Grandees of Spain
Spanish Freemasons
Spanish duellists